Marc-Andrea Hüsler and Kamil Majchrzak were the defending champions but chose not to defend their title.

Treat Huey and Max Schnur won the title after defeating Dustin Brown and Julian Lenz 7–6(8–6), 6–4 in the final.

Seeds

Draw

References

External links
 Main draw

Hamburg Ladies and Gents Cup - Men's doubles